Richard Hogg may refer to:

 Richard Hogg, British artist, see Hohokum
 Richard M. Hogg (1944–2007), Scottish linguist